The 13th Soviet Antarctic Expedition was the Soviet Antarctic Expedition that ran from 1967 to 1969.

The leader of the expedition was Aleksei Treshnikov. American scientists on the expedition researched the accessible ice-free locations on the west coast of Enderby Land.

References
 MacNamara, E. E. (1970) "Some Limnological Observations from Enderby Land, Antarctica" in Limnology and Oceanography pp. 768–75

 13
Antarctic Expedition 13
Antarctic Expedition 13
Antarctic Expedition 13
1967 in Antarctica
1968 in Antarctica
1969 in Antarctica